Nallachius pulchellus is a species of pleasing lacewing in the family Dilaridae. It is found in the Caribbean Sea, Central America, and North America.

References

Further reading

 
 
 

Hemerobiiformia
Articles created by Qbugbot
Insects described in 1938